GCK Motorsport, formally known as GC Kompetition, is a subsidiary of Green Corp Konnection (GCK) and a French motorsport team founded by freeriding ski champion, rally driver and stunt driver Guerlain Chicherit in 2017. 
GCK made its debut in the 2018 FIA World Rallycross Championship, fielding two Renault Méganes, built by British motorsport company Prodrive.

The team grew to four cars for 2019, with the two Renault Méganes of GC Kompetition joined by two Renault Clios as part of a new GCK Academy team. From round 5 onwards the team grew again to five cars, with another Renault Mégane for young driver Rokas Baciuška.

For 2020, GCK grew again to five permanent cars competing in the FIA World Rallycross Championship, with two Renault Méganes now driven by X-Games Gold Medalist Liam Doran & 2019 FIA World Rallycross Championship runner-up Andreas Bakkerud as GCK Monster Energy RX Cartel. They were joined by two Renault Clios as part of a new Unkorrupted team driven by Guerlain Chicherit and Rokas Baciuska and another Renault Mégane for Anton Marklund as GCK Bilstein independently. 
Results were uninspiring for GCK with all cars showing a lack of performance and reliability, most notably Unkorrupted who changed driver line up following Rokas Baciuska departure ahead of Round 3 in Finland, Kevin Abbring stepped in to take his place but both Unkorrupted cars failed to qualify including Liam Doran who was plagued with reliability issues.

GCK Motorsport is not an official Renault factory team, though Chicherit has said he has ambitions to partner with a manufacturer in the future of Rallycross Electrification and Dakar Rally where GCK Motorsport is developing a Hydrogen-powered vehicle for 2024.

Racing record

Complete FIA World Rallycross Championship results
(key)

Supercar

References

External links
Official website

French auto racing teams
2017 establishments in France
World Rallycross Championship teams
Dakar rally racing teams
Auto racing teams established in 2017